Moral character or character (derived from charaktêr) is an analysis of an individual's steady moral qualities. The concept of character can express a variety of attributes, including the presence or lack of virtues such as empathy, courage, fortitude, honesty, and loyalty, or of good behaviors or habits; these attributes are also a part of one's soft skills. Moral character primarily refers to the collection of qualities that differentiate one individual from anotheralthough on a cultural level, the group of moral behaviors to which a social group adheres can be said to unite and define it culturally as distinct from others. Psychologist Lawrence Pervin defines moral character as "a disposition to express behavior in consistent patterns of functions across a range of situations". Same as, the philosopher Marie I. George refers to moral character as the "sum of one’s moral habits and dispositions". Aristotle has said, "we must take as a sign of states of character the pleasure or pain that ensues on acts."

Overview
The word "character" is derived from the Ancient Greek word "charaktêr", referring to a mark impressed upon a coin. Later it came to mean a point by which one thing was told apart from others. There are two approaches when dealing with moral character: Normative ethics involve moral standards that exhibit right and wrong conduct. It is a test of proper behavior and determining what is right and wrong. Applied ethics involve specific and controversial issues along with a moral choice, and tend to involve situations where people are either for or against the issue.

In 1982 V. Campbell and R. Bond proposed the following as major sources in influencing character and moral development: heredity, early childhood experience, modeling by important adults and older youth, peer influence, the general physical and social environment, the communications media, the teachings of schools and other institutions, and specific situations and roles that elicit corresponding behavior.

The field of business ethics examines moral controversies relating to the social responsibilities of capitalist business practices, the moral status of corporate entities, deceptive advertising, insider trading, employee rights, job discrimination, affirmative action and drug testing.

In the military field, character is considered particularly relevant in the leadership development area. Military leaders should not only "know" theoretically the moral values but they must embody these values.

History

The Stanford Encyclopedia of Philosophy provides a historical account of some important developments in philosophical approaches to moral character. A lot of attention is given to Plato, Aristotle, and Karl Marx's views, since they all follow the idea of moral character after the Greeks. Marx accepts Aristotle's insight that virtue and good character are based on a sense of self-esteem and self-confidence.

Plato believed that the soul is divided into three parts of desire: Rational, Appetitive, or Spirited. In order to have moral character, we must understand what contributes to our overall good and have our spirited and appetitive desires educated properly, so that they can agree with the guidance provided by the rational part of the soul.

Aristotle tells us that there are good people in the world.  These are those who exhibit excellences – excellences of thought and excellences of character. His phrase for excellences of character – êthikai aretai – we usually translate as moral virtue or moral excellence. When we speak of a moral virtue or an excellence of character, the emphasis is on the combination of qualities that make an individual the sort of ethically admirable person that he is. Aristotle defines virtuous character at the beginning of Book II in Nicomachean Ethics: "Excellence of character, then, is a state concerned with choice, lying in a mean relative to us, this being determined by reason and in the way in which the man of practical wisdom would determine it. Now it is a mean between two vices, that which depends on excess and that which depends on defect”. In Aristotle's view, good character is based on two naturally occurring psychological responses that most people experience without difficulty: our tendency to take pleasure from self-realizing activity and our tendency to form friendly feelings toward others under specific circumstances. Based on his view, virtually everyone is capable of becoming better and they are the ones responsible for actions that express (or could express) their character.

Abraham Lincoln once said, "Character is like a tree and reputation like its shadow. The shadow is what we think of it; the tree is the real thing."

In 1919,  Albert Einstein wrote in a letter to his friend, Dutch physicist Hendrik Lorentz, about his disillusionment concerning the inhumane consequences of World War I.  He noted “We must remember that, on the average, men’s moral qualities do not greatly vary from country to country”.

Religious views

Christian character is also defined as presenting the "Fruit of the Holy Spirit": love, joy, peace, patience, kindness, goodness, faithfulness, gentleness and self-control. Doctrines of grace and total depravity assert that – due to original sin – mankind, entirely or in part, was unable to be good without God's intervention; otherwise at best, one could only ape good behavior for selfish reasons.

Scientific experiments
In one experiment that was done in the United States in 1985, the moral character of a person was based on whether or not a person had found a dime in a public phone booth. The findings were that 87% of subjects who found a dime in a phone booth mailed a sealed and addressed envelope that was left at the booth in an apparent mistake by someone else, while only 4% of those who did not find a dime helped. Some  found it very troubling that people would be influenced by such morally trivial factors in their choice whether to provide low-cost assistance to others. John M. Doris raises the issue of ecological validity – do experimental findings reflect phenomena found in natural contexts. He recognizes that these results are counterintuitive to the way most of us think about morally relevant behavior.

Another experiment that was done that asked college students at Cornell to predict how they would behave when faced with one of several moral dilemmas, and to make the same predictions for their peers. Again and again, people predicted that they would be more generous and kind than others. Yet when put into the moral dilemma, the subjects did not behave as generously or as kindly as they had predicted. In psychological terms, the experimental subjects were successfully anticipating the base rate of moral behavior and accurately predicting how often others, in general, would be self-sacrificing.

Criticism
In the 1990s and 2000s, a number of philosophers and social scientists began to question the very presuppositions that theories of moral character and moral character traits are based on. Due to the importance of moral character to issues in philosophy, it is unlikely that the debates over the nature of moral character will end anytime soon.

Situationism can be understood as composed of three central claims:
 Non-robustness Claim: moral character traits are not consistent across a wide spectrum of trait-relevant situations. Whatever moral character traits an individual has are situation specific.
 Consistency Claim: while a person's moral character traits are relatively stable over time, this should be understood as consistency of situation specific traits, rather than robust traits.
 Fragmentation Claim: a person's moral character traits do not have the evaluative integrity suggested by the Integrity Claim. There may be considerable disunity in a person's moral character among his or her situation-specific character traits.

According to Situationists, the empirical evidence favors their view of moral character over the Traditional View. Hugh Hartshorne and M. A. May's study of the trait of honesty among school children found no cross-situational correlation. A child may be consistently honest with his friends, but not with his parents or teachers. From this and other studies, Hartshorne and May concluded that character traits are not robust but rather "specific functions of life situations".

These recent challenges to the Traditional View have not gone unnoticed. Some have attempted to modify the Traditional View to insulate it from these challenges, while others have tried to show how these challenges fail to undermine the Traditional View at all. For example, Dana Nelkin (2005), Christian Miller (2003), Gopal Sreenivasan (2002), and John Sabini and Maury Silver (2005), among others, have argued that the empirical evidence cited by the Situationists does not show that individuals lack robust character traits.

A second challenge to the traditional view can be found in the idea of moral luck. This idea is that moral luck occurs when the moral judgment of an agent depends on factors beyond the agent's control. Fiery Cushman clarifies that this is judgement of an outcome comprising both the agent's character and an unanticipated circumstance, rather than an agent's intent. There are number of ways that moral luck can motivate criticisms of moral character. It is similar to "the kind of problems and situations one faces" If all of an agent's moral character traits are situation-specific rather than robust, what traits an agent manifests will depend on the situation that she finds herself in. But what situations an agent finds herself in is often beyond her control and thus a matter of situational luck. Whether moral character traits are robust or situation-specific, some have suggested that what character traits one has is itself a matter of luck. If our having certain traits is itself a matter of luck, this would seem to undermine one's moral responsibility for one's moral character, and thus the concept of moral character altogether. As Owen Flanagan and Amélie Oksenberg Rorty write:

A moral character trait is a character trait for which the agent is morally responsible. If moral responsibility is impossible, however, then agents cannot be held responsible, depending on age, for their character traits or for the behaviors that they do as a result of those character traits.

A similar argument has also recently been advocated by Bruce Waller. According to Waller, no one is "morally responsible for her character or deliberative powers, or for the results that flow from them.… Given the fact that she was shaped to have such characteristics by environmental (or evolutionary) forces far beyond her control, she deserves no blame [nor praise]".

See also

 Character education
 Ethics
 Moral enhancement
 Moral identity
 Moral psychology

References

Bibliography
 Blum, Lawrence (2003). "Review of Doris's Lack of Character", Notre Dame Philosophical Reviews.
 Homiak, Marcia (2008). "Moral Character", The Stanford Encyclopedia of Philosophy (Fall Edition), Edward N. Zalta (ed.).
 Huitt, William (2004). 
 Pervin, Lawrence (1994). "A Critical Analysis of Current Trait Theory", Psychological Inquiry 5, pp. 103–113.

External links
 

Character
Moral psychology
Christian ethics
Virtue ethics
Leadership